Peel Sessions 1979–1983 is a compilation album by English electronic band Orchestral Manoeuvres in the Dark (OMD), released in 2000. The songs were recorded between 1979 and 1983 for the BBC Radio 1 show presented by John Peel. "Electricity" is added as a bonus track and is the original version that was featured on their debut single on Factory Records (FAC6). "Bunker Soldiers" was recorded for the first and fourth sessions; the version from the fourth session was not released on this album.

Reception

Aaron Badgley of AllMusic wrote, "The CD is well recorded, and the playing is tight and exciting. Andy McCluskey and Paul Humphreys have never sounded so good and so alive and energetic on any of the studio releases. Highly recommended." Badgley asserted that the original 7" version of "Electricity" is itself "worth the price of the CD". Trouser Press called the album "a must-have for fans". In The Morning News, Andrew Womack said, "OMD is not just about 'If You Leave'. And this compilation of Peel Sessions from 1979 to 1983 highlights their songwriting ability, focus, and technique by stripping all the songs to their essentials."

Track listing

The Peel sessions
All the Peel sessions by OMD were recorded at Maida Vale 4 studio.

First Peel Session
The first Peel session was recorded on 20 August 1979 and transmitted on 3 September 1979.

Track list:
 "Bunker Soldiers"
 "Julia's Song"
 "Messages"
 "Red Frame/White Light"

Producer: Tony Wilson, engineer: Dave Dade.

Line up:
 Andy McCluskey (bass, vocals, drum machine)
 Paul Humphreys (keyboards, vocals)

Second Peel Session
The second Peel session was recorded on 14 April 1980 and transmitted on 21 April 1980.

Track list:
 "Pretending to See the Future"
 "Enola Gay"
 "Dancing"
 "Motion and Heart"

Producer: Tony Wilson, engineer: Dave Dade.

Line up:
 Andy McCluskey: bass, vocals, drum machine
 Paul Humphreys: keyboards, vocals
 David Hughes: keyboards
 Malcolm Holmes: drums

Third Peel Session
The third Peel session was recorded on 29 September 1980 and transmitted on 6 October 1980.

Track list:
 "Annex"
 "The Misunderstanding"
 "The More I See You"

Producer: Tony Wilson, engineer: Dave Dade.

Line up:
 Andy McCluskey: bass, vocals, drum machine
 Paul Humphreys: keyboards, vocals
 Martin Cooper: synthesizer (on "The Misunderstanding" only)
 Malcolm Holmes: drums

Fourth Peel Session
The fourth Peel session was recorded on 29 January 1983 and transmitted on 21 February 1983.

Track list:
 "Genetic Engineering"
 "Off All the Things We've Made"
 "ABC Auto Industry"
 "Bunker Soldiers"

Producer: Dale Griffin, engineers: Harry Parker and Martin Colley.

Line up:
 Andy McCluskey: bass, vocals, drum machine
 Paul Humphreys: keyboards, vocals
 Martin Cooper: synthesizer
 Malcolm Holmes: drums

References 

Orchestral Manoeuvres in the Dark albums
Peel Sessions recordings
2000 live albums
2000 compilation albums
Virgin Records compilation albums
Virgin Records live albums